Frederick J. Worrall (8 September 1910 – 13 April 1979) was an English footballer born in Warrington, Lancashire, who played as an outside right in the Football League for Oldham Athletic, Portsmouth and Crewe Alexandra. He was capped twice for England, scoring on his debut against the Netherlands in Amsterdam in May 1935, before following it up with another goal in England's 3–1 win over Ireland in the British Championship in November 1936. He was noted for his superstitious nature: when Portsmouth played in the 1939 FA Cup Final, he took his small horseshoe, put a sprig of white heather in each sock, tied a small white elephant to one of his garters and put a lucky sixpence in his boots, as well as putting on Pompey manager Jack Tinn's lucky spats. He set up the second goal in Portsmouth's 4–1 win, and left the club at the end of the Second World War. He had continued to play for Portsmouth during the war, but also made seven appearances for Manchester United during the 1945–46 War League season, scoring twice.

References

External links
 - Seasiders.net

1910 births
1979 deaths
Footballers from Warrington
English footballers
England international footballers
Association football wingers
Oldham Athletic A.F.C. players
Portsmouth F.C. players
Crewe Alexandra F.C. players
English Football League players
Blackpool F.C. wartime guest players
Manchester United F.C. wartime guest players
English Football League representative players
FA Cup Final players